Tobe Dam is a gravity dam located in Aomori Prefecture in Japan. The dam is used for flood control. The catchment area of the dam is 8.3 km2. The dam impounds about 11  ha of land when full and can store 1420 thousand cubic meters of water. The construction of the dam was started on 1968 and completed in 1974.

References

Dams in Aomori Prefecture
1974 establishments in Japan